Karang Baru (Jawoë: كارڠ بارو) is a town and district in Aceh province of Indonesia and it is the seat (capital) of Aceh Tamiang Regency. It covers an area of 139.45 km2 and had a population of 36,226 at the 2010 Census and 43,535 at the 2020 Census; the official estimate as at mid 2021 was 44,117.

References

Regency seats of Aceh
Populated places in Aceh